Reuben W. Coon (May 31, 1842–February 18, 1908) was an American lawyer, newspaper editor, and politician.

Coon was born in Frankfort, Indiana. He went to Shurtleff College and was admitted to the Illinois bar. Coon had lived in Pana, Illinois and eventually settled in Waukegan, Illinois with his wife and family. He owned The Waukegan Gazette and the Belvidere Northwestern newspapers. He also served as state's attorney for Boone County, Illinois. Coon served in the Illinois Senate from 1893 to 1897 and was a Republican. Coon died at his home in Waukegan, Illinois from heart failure.

Notes

External links

1842 births
1908 deaths
People from Frankfort, Indiana
People from Pana, Illinois
People from Waukegan, Illinois
Shurtleff College alumni
Editors of Illinois newspapers
Illinois lawyers
Republican Party Illinois state senators
19th-century American politicians